The John Harned House is a historic house located at 26 Little Neck Road in Centerport, Suffolk County, New York.

Description and history 
It consists of two -story, three-bay wide, gable-roofed sections built in about 1850. It has a shed-roofed porch on square columns and a central chimney. Also located on the property is a contributing late-19th-century barn.

It was added to the National Register of Historic Places on September 26, 1985.

References

Houses on the National Register of Historic Places in New York (state)
Houses completed in 1850
Houses in Suffolk County, New York
National Register of Historic Places in Suffolk County, New York